The 2019 Suncorp Super Netball season was the third season of the premier netball league in Australia. The season began on 27 April and concluded on 15 September 2019, however it was suspended for most of the month of July due to the Netball World Cup, which was played in Liverpool.

The New South Wales Swifts won the premiership, defeating two-time defending premiers Sunshine Coast Lightning by 17 goals in the Grand Final at the Brisbane Entertainment Centre.

Overview

Teams

Format
The season is played over fourteen rounds, allowing every team to play each other twice, once at home and once away. The top four teams on the ladder at the conclusion of the regular season qualify for the finals series. In the first week of the finals series, the 1st ranked team hosts the 2nd ranked team in the major semi-final (with the winner of that match to qualify for the Grand Final) and the 3rd ranked team hosts the 4th ranked team in the minor semi-final (with the loser of that match eliminated). The loser of the major semi-final then hosts the winner of the minor semi-final in the preliminary final. The winner of the major semi-final then hosts the winner of the preliminary final in the Grand Final.

Player transfers
At the start of Super Netball in 2017, all players were contracted for a maximum of two years in line with the initial collective bargaining agreement negotiated by the players' association. Clubs were free to re-sign existing players in the last few weeks of the 2018 season, before the transfer window opened for unimpeded acquisitions at the end of the season. Clubs were given until 25 September 2018 to finalise their rosters for the 2019 season.

Arrivals
The following table is a list of players who moved clubs/leagues into Super Netball, or were elevated into a permanent position in the senior team, during the off-season. It does not include players who were re-signed by their original Super Netball clubs.

Departures
The following table is a list of players who left Super Netball clubs at the end of the previous season and joined a foreign club. It does not include players who retired from Super Netball at the end of the previous season.

Pre-season tournament
The league introduced a pre-season tournament for the first time, known as the #TeamGirls Cup. The tournament took place between 8 and 10 March at the newly constructed Queensland State Netball Centre.

The eight Super Netball teams were split into two groups of four and played each of their group opponents once, before playing an inter-group match to determine places from first to eighth. All matches were live-streamed on the Netball Live App and Telstra TV, with the final match between the two top teams broadcast on the Nine Network. The tournament was won by the Collingwood Magpies, who defeated local rivals the Melbourne Vixens by six goals in the final.

Pool A Fixtures

Pool B Fixtures

Finals

Regular season

Round 1

Round 2

Round 3

Round 4

Round 5

Round 6

Round 7

Round 8

Round 9

Round 10

Round 11

Round 12

Round 13

Round 14

Ladder

Finals series

Major semi-final

Minor semi-final

 The Vixens were required to shift their home final to the SNHC due to their usual venues (Melbourne Arena and Margaret Court Arena) being unavailable.

Preliminary final

Grand Final

 Grand Final MVP Winner: Samantha Wallace (New South Wales Swifts)

Nissan Net Points Team of the Week

Awards
 The Player of the Year Award was won by Jhaniele Fowler of the West Coast Fever, who claimed the award for the second consecutive year.
 The Grand Final MVP Award was won by Samantha Wallace of the New South Wales Swifts, who scored 40 goals from 44 attempts in the Grand Final.
 The Rising Star Award was won by Amy Parmenter of Giants Netball.
 The Joyce Brown Coach of the Year award was won by Briony Akle, coach of the premiership team the New South Wales Swifts.
 The Leading Goalscorer Award was won by Jhaniele Fowler of the West Coast Fever, who scored 709 goals in the regular season.
 The following players were named in the Super Netball Team of the Year:

Defenders 
 Goal Keeper: Emily Mannix(Melbourne Vixens)
 Goal Defence: Karla Pretorius(Sunshine Coast Lightning)

Midcourters 
 Wing Defence: Renae Ingles(Melbourne Vixens)
 Centre: Kate Moloney(Melbourne Vixens)
 Wing Attack: Liz Watson(Melbourne Vixens)

Attackers 
 Goal Attack: Gretel Tippett(Queensland Firebirds)
 Goal Shooter: Jhaniele Fowler(West Coast Fever)

Reserves 
 Attack Reserve: Samantha Wallace(New South Wales Swifts)
 Micourt Reserve: Ashleigh Brazill(Collingwood Magpies)
 Defence Reserve: Shamera Sterling(Adelaide Thunderbirds)

References

External links
 
 Season results

2019
2019 in Australian netball